The Immaculate Conception Cathedral  also called Córdoba Cathedral is the main Catholic church in the city of Córdoba in the state of Veracruz in Mexico. It was built in the first half of the seventeenth century. It is also headquarters of the Diocese of Córdoba and is dedicated to the Virgin of the Immaculate Conception, also the temple was known as the Immaculate Conception, it is located opposite the Plaza de Armas in the historic center of the city and its bells are made from copper and iron which were brought from Mexico city.

See also
Roman Catholicism in Mexico
Immaculate Conception Cathedral

References

Roman Catholic cathedrals in Mexico
Buildings and structures in Córdoba, Veracruz
Roman Catholic churches completed in 1725
18th-century Roman Catholic church buildings in Mexico